Joni is a 1980 drama film directed by James F. Collier.  It is based on the book of the same name and is the true story of Joni Eareckson Tada (played by herself), a seventeen-year-old girl who becomes paralyzed after a diving accident. Through her physical, emotional and spiritual struggles, Joni learns to trust in God.  Billy Graham financed the film through his company World Wide Pictures and appears in a cameo.

Plot 
In 1967, at age 17, Joni Eareckson is involved in a diving accident that leaves her a quadriplegic.  As she attempts to come to terms with her new disability, her Christian faith grows.

Cast 
 Joni Eareckson Tada as herself
 Bert Remsen as John Eareckson
 Katherine De Hetre as Jay Eareckson
 Cooper Huckabee as Dick Filbert
 John Milford as Dr. Sherrill
 Jay W. MacIntosh as Lindy Eareckson
 Louise Hoven as Diana
 Michael Mancini as Don Bertolli
 Richard Lineback as Steve Estes
 Ernie Hudson as Earl
 Betsy Jones-Moreland as Mrs. Barber

Release 
Joni premiered on October 24, 1980, in Los Angeles.  It played in New York City on March 4, 1983.

Reception 
Janet Maslin of The New York Times wrote the film is made more interesting and poignant by casting Tada as herself.  TV Guide rated it 2/4 stars and called Tada "a natural actress".

References

External links 
 
 

1980 films
1980 drama films
American drama films
American independent films
Films about evangelicalism
Films directed by James F. Collier
Films about paraplegics or quadriplegics
1980s English-language films
1980s American films